Mohammad-Jafar Yahaghi (also Romanizedd as Mohammad-Ja’far Yāhaghghi; born 1947 in Ferdows, South Khorasan, Iran) is a celebrated Persian writer, literary critic, editor and translator and distinguished professor of literature at Ferdowsi University of Mashad. He is currently the head of Center of Excellence in Researches about Ferdowsi and Khorasan literature.

Mohammad-Jafar Yahaghi graduated from Tehran University in 1981 with a doctorate degree in Persian literature. He is known for his works on Shahnama and Iranian epic literature.

He has written, edited and translated more than 20 books. He lives in Mashhad.

Notes 

Iranian literary critics
Iranian translators
Academic staff of Ferdowsi University of Mashad
Living people
People from Ferdows
1947 births
Members of the Academy of Persian Language and Literature
Iranian memoirists
Researchers of Persian literature
Faculty of Letters and Humanities of the University of Tehran alumni
Distinguished professors in Iran